The Journal of Oleo Science is a monthly peer-reviewed academic journal covering the various agricultural, biological, chemical, health, medical, nutritional, and physical properties of fats and oils. It is published by the Japan Oil Chemists' Society and the editor-in-chief is Osamu Shibata (Nagasaki International University).

History
The journal was established in 1952 as the Journal of Oil Chemists' Society, Japan and was published exclusively in Japanese for the first 4 volumes. From 1956 until 2000 (vols. 5–49), the journal was renamed Journal of Japan Oil Chemists' Society and published articles in English or Japanese. It obtained its current name in 2011 (vols 50–present), when it became an exclusively English-language journal. The journal was licensed under “Creative Commons attribution 4.0" in February 2021 and indexed in the DOAJ (Directory of Open Access Journals) on April 13, 2021.

Abstracting and indexing 
The journal is abstracted and indexed in:

According to the Journal Citation Reports, the journal has a 2020 impact factor of 1.601.

References

External links

Japan Oil Chemists' Society

Biochemistry journals
Engineering journals
English-language journals
Publications established in 1952
Monthly journals